Łosośniki  is a settlement in Gmina Miastko, Bytów County, Pomeranian Voivodeship, in northern Poland. The village was in Słupsk Voivodeship from 1975 to 1998, when Pomeranian Voivodeship and West Pomeranian Voivodeship (Sławno County) superseded Słupsk Voivodeship (province).

References

Map of the Gmina Miastko

Villages in Bytów County